This is a list of notable alumni who graduated and attended Rollins College.

RC=Rollins College 
CB=Crummer Graduate School of Business
HH=Hamilton Holt School

References

Rollins College alumni